Fort Street may refer to:

Streets
Fort Street, Hong Kong, a street in North Point, Hong Kong Island, Hong Kong
Fort Street (Los Angeles), California, USA; now known as Broadway
M-85 (Michigan highway) (Fort Street), USA; a Michigan highway 
Fort Street (Omaha), a major east–west thoroughfare in Omaha, Nebraska, USA

Facilities and structures
Fort Street High School, a government secondary selective school located in Sydney, New South Wales, Australia
Fort Street Public School, a government primary school located in Sydney, New South Wales, Australia
Fort Street Mall, Downtown Honolulu, Hawaii, USA
Fort Street Presbyterian Church (Detroit, Michigan), USA
Fort Street Presbyterian Church (San Marcos, Texas), USA
Fort Street Union Depot, West Fort Street, Detroit, Michigan, USA; a train station, a union station used by multiple railroad companies

Other uses
Fort Street (constituency), a constituency in the Eastern District, Hong Kong
Fort Street Historic District, Boise, Idaho, USA

See also

 Fortified gateway, a street fort for controlling passage on a street
 Fort Road Food Street, Walled City, Lahore, Punjab, Pakistan
 Fort Street Presbyterian Church (disambiguation)
 
 Fort (disambiguation)
 Street (disambiguation)
 Fort Road (disambiguation)
 Fort Avenue (disambiguation)